Caffrocrambus ochreus is a moth in the family Crambidae. It was described by Stanisław Błeszyński in 1970. It is found in Kenya, Tanzania and Zimbabwe.

References

Crambinae
Moths described in 1970
Moths of Africa